= Office for Cooperation with Civil Society =

- Канцеларија за сарадњу с цивилним друштвом Kancelarija za saradnju sa civilnim društvom

Office overview
- Formed: 23 April 2010
- Jurisdiction: Government of Serbia
- Headquarters: Bulevar Mihajla Pupina 2, Belgrade, Serbia
- Office executive: Žarko Stepanović, Director
- Website: www.civilnodrustvo.gov.rs

The Office for Cooperation with Civil Society of the Republic of Serbia (Serbian: Канцеларија за сарадњу с цивилним друштвом / Kancelarija za saradnju sa civilnim društvom) is a cooperation body of the Government of Serbia. It was constituted on 23 April 2010. According to its mandate, Office should provide the support to the CSOs in the process of the defining and implementing legislative procedures altogether with public policies, and thereby contributing to a positive pressure on the governmental institutions.

The Serbian government abolished the Office for Cooperation with the Civil Society in 2020, which has existed for the last 10 years as a government service with a coordinating role in ensuring cooperation between the civil sector and all parts of the public sector. This decision has alerted Serbian CSOs who were already conscious of the civil society environment. The scope of work of the former Office for Cooperation with the Civil Society now falls under the Ministry of Human and Minority Rights and Social Dialogue. The fact that relations with civil society are placed under one ministry puts in question the space for constructive cooperation, raises concerns of the transparency of budget allocations and narrows citizens’ participation.

== Organization and jurisdiction ==
The director used to be in charge of the Office, and is appointed by the Government of Serbia. The mandate of the director was 5 years.

The jurisdiction of the Office was established by its statute:

- Initiating dialogue with civil society on matters of mutual interest;
- Participating in the drafting and implementation of strategic documents pertaining to creating an enabling environment conducive to civil society development;
- Initiating the adoption of regulations and other general legal instruments governing the status of associations and other civil society organizations, as the foundation for building a society based on democracy, inclusion and solidarity;
- Participating in the drafting of consolidated reports to the Government on the expenditure of funds that have been provided and paid to associations and other civil society organizations from the Republic of Serbia Budget in support of their programme activities;
- Organizing round-table discussions and conferences;
- Issuing publications and undertaking other measures and activities aimed at upgrading the capacities and raising the sustainability of associations’ and other civil society organizations’ operation and actions;
- Collecting and disseminating information relevant to associations’ and other civil society organizations’ operation;
- Conducting technical affairs pertaining to cooperation and exchange of experiences with similar governmental institutions in the region, European Union member states and the world;
- Cooperating with competent authorities in the conduct of affairs pertaining to the programming and management of European Union pre-accession and other funds for the support to civil society;
- Drafting of the preparation of acts which government supervises, directs and coordinates the activities of the ministries and special organizations that are related to issues of civil society and government cooperation with civil society;
- Conducting of other responsibilities within the civil society framework delegated by Serbian Government.
